Brian Welch (born January 18, 1984) is an American former ski jumper who competed at the 2002 Winter Olympics.

References

1984 births
Living people
American male ski jumpers
Olympic ski jumpers of the United States
Ski jumpers at the 2002 Winter Olympics
Place of birth missing (living people)